The 1896 Chicago Physicians and Surgeons football team was an American football team that represented the College of Physicians and Surgeons of Chicago in the 1896 college football season.  The doctors compiled a 2–4–2 record, and were outscored by their opponents 84 to 56.  In a game proclaimed to be the "Western medical school football championship", Chicago P&S forfeited the contest in the 2nd half, because of their refusal to play after a disputed Rush Medical touchdown.

Schedule

References

Chicago Physicians and Surgeons
Chicago Physicians and Surgeons football seasons
Chicago Physicians and Surgeons football